Tyre most often refers to:

 Tire, the outer part of a wheel
 Tyre, Lebanon, a Mediterranean city

Tyre or Tyres may also refer to:

Other places

Lebanon 

 See of Tyre, a Christian diocese
 Tyre District, in the South Governorate
 Tyre Hippodrome, a UNESCO World Heritage site

United States 

 Tyre, Michigan
 Tyre, New York

Mythology

 Tyres, one of two minor Greek mythological figures

People with the name 

 Tyre Glasper (born 1987), American football linebacker
 Tyre Nichols (1993–2023), American man killed by police
 Tyre Phillips (born 1997), American football offensive guard
 Colin Tyre, Lord Tyre (born 1956), Scottish judge
 Tyre York (1836–1916), U.S. Congressman from North Carolina

See also 

 
 Siege of Tyre (disambiguation)
 Tire (disambiguation)
 Tyers (disambiguation)
 Tyr (disambiguation)
 Tyree (disambiguation)